Ellmer is a surname. Notable people with the surname include:

Max Ellmer (1909–1984), Swiss tennis player 
Rolf Ellmer (born 1960), German electronic musician

See also
Eller (surname)
Elmer